Codonosigaceae is a family of Choanoflagellates.

Species
 Codosiga 
 Desmarella 
 Kentrosiga 
 Monosiga 
 Proterospongia 
 Sphaeroeca 
 Stylochromonas 

Genus Diplosigopsis  (uncertain > nomen dubium)

References

External links 
 

Choanoflagellatea
Opisthokont families